The  (New Energy Train) was an experimental railcar which has been used to test a number of alternative power sources by the Railway Technical Research Institute (RTRI) and East Japan Railway Company (JR East) in Japan since 2003.

History

KiYa E991 diesel/battery hybrid railcar
The "NE Train" was first delivered from Tokyu Car Corporation in April 2003, configured as the world's first hybrid diesel/battery railcar and classified as KiYa E991-1. The stainless steel bodyshell was derived from the E127-100 series EMU design, although with cabs at both ends instead of one in a married pair, two doors per side instead of three, and no gangways. From 6 May 2003, it was tested on the Nikkō and Karasuyama Lines. Data obtained from these trials was used to develop the KiHa E200 DMU, which entered service on the Koumi Line from July 2007. The train used small lithium-ion batteries and high powered cells as would be used in a hybrid automobile.

KuMoYa E995 fuel-cell/battery hybrid railcar
The "NE Train" underwent modifications in 2006 to replace the diesel generator with a hydrogen fuel cell, becoming the world's first fuel-cell/battery hybrid railway vehicle, classified KuMoYa E995-1. The vehicle was fitted with six hydrogen tanks (with total capacity of ) and lithium-ion batteries with increased storage capacity (19 kWh) compared with the earlier KiYa E991 hybrid version. These powered the train's two  traction motors.

KuMoYa E995 series battery railcar

The "NE Train" again underwent modifications at Tokyu Car Corporation's factory in Yokohama in 2009 to become a battery electric multiple unit with the addition of a pantograph and storage batteries replacing the earlier fuel cell, and rebranded .

The railcar was test-run within Ōmiya Works from October 2009, with test running on the Utsunomiya Line under consideration from January 2010.

The unit was modified in August 2011, with one of the four lithium battery units relocated beneath the passenger seats, increasing available space.

In February and March 2012, the programme entered its final phase. Nighttime trial runs were conducted on the non-electrified Karasuyama Line outside operating hours. A recharging facility was built at the line terminus Karasuyama Station. It consists of a rigid overhead conductor bar which recharges the train via its pantograph. The overhead conductor bar is rated at 1,500 V DC, powered by local electricity grid at 6,600 V AC.

The programme eventually developed into the EV-E301 series, a two-car battery electric multiple unit. The series entered passenger service on the Karasuyama Line and Tohoku Main Line in March 2014.

See also
 Smart BEST, an experimental Japanese battery train built by Kinki Sharyo in 2012

References

External links

 JR East press release announcing "NE Train" fuel-cell hybrid programme (11 April 2006) 
 JR East press release announcing "NE Train" battery railcar programme (6 October 2009) 

East Japan Railway Company
Train-related introductions in 2003
Hybrid multiple units of Japan
Experimental vehicles
Tokyu Car multiple units